Joshua Michael Garrels (born September 25, 1980) is an American singer-songwriter, producer, and composer from South Bend, Indiana. His music combines traditional folk music with other musical elements and the nontraditional exploration of Christian themes.

Biography
Garrels is originally from South Bend, Indiana. He currently lives in Muncie, Indiana, with his wife and five children. In 2005, he co-founded Small Voice Records and released Over Oceans, Jacaranda, Lost Animals and Home. Garrels released his sixth album in June 2011 titled Love & War & The Sea in Between. Christianity Today called the album "prophetic, incisive, achingly human, and longingly spiritual", and rated it as their 2011 Album of The Year. In 2012, Garrels collaborated with the music collective Mason Jar Music to film the music-documentary movie The Sea in Between, in which Mason Jar and Garrels traveled to the remote Mayne Island to perform music on several of Mayne's most beautiful locations. "Don't Wait For Me" was featured on American Idol on January 29, 2014. He released Home on April 7, 2015.

Charity
From March 14, 2013, to March 28, 2013, (14 days) Garrels had 161,245 album downloads on Noisetrade.com which raised $71,566 in "tips". All of the funds were given in full to World Relief to help with their work to bring peace and restoration to the Democratic Republic of the Congo.

Continued work with Noisetrade 
In the weeks leading up to the 2015 release of the album Home, Garrels gave away free copies of his previous albums on Noisetrade.com. When Home was released, listeners had a choice between buying it on ITunes or downloading it for free. Garrels gave away 42,000 copies of Home its first week.

Discography

Studio albums
 Stone Tree (2002)
 Underquiet (2003)
 Over Oceans (2006)
 Jacaranda (2008)
 Lost Animals (2009)
 Love & War & The Sea in Between (2011)
 Love & War: B-Sides & Remixes (2012)
 The Sea In Between DVD Soundtrack (2013)
 Home (2015) (Billboard 200 No. 83)
 2015 Sampler (2015)
 The Light Came Down (2016) – Christmas album
 Chrysaline (2019)
 Peace To All Who Enter Here (2020)

Compilation albums 
 Early Work Vol.1 (2020)
 Early Work Vol.2 (2021)

Notable interviews
 NPR (December 26, 2013)
 InterVarsity Christian Fellowship (October 17, 2013)
 Relevant (April 8, 2013)
 The Huffington Post (March 26, 2013)

References

External links

Billups, Sara. "About Josh Garrels." N.p., n.d. Web. October 26, 2012.

1980 births
Living people
Musicians from South Bend, Indiana
Musicians from Portland, Oregon
Members of the Christian and Missionary Alliance
American performers of Christian music